The 2000 Men's Ice Hockey World Championships were the 64th such event organized by the International Ice Hockey Federation. 42 teams representing their countries participated in several levels of competition. The competition also served as qualifications for division placements in the 2001 competition.

World Championship Group A (Russia)

Final standings
 
 
 
 
 
 
 
 
 
 
 
 
 
 
  — relegated to Division I for 2001

World Championship Group B (Poland)
Played April 12–21 in Katowice and Krakow.  This was the final year of the qualifying tournaments (except for the "Far East"), so it was a simple matter of the winner being promoted.  This was also the final year of the traditional eight team tournament.  Beginning in 2001 Group B would be renamed 'Division I' and consist of two six team divisions.

Final Round 17–24 Place

Germany was promoted to the 2001 IIHF World Championship.  No team was relegated.

World Championship Group C (China PR)
Played March 20–26 in Beijing.  In 1999 Group C was disrupted because of political issues surrounding Kosovo.  The IIHF chose to have no team relegated and have Yugoslavia retain their position, the result was a nine team tournament this year.  With the forthcoming realignment, four nations had the opportunity to be promoted to Division I, the remaining five would participate in next year's Division II.

First round

Group 1

Hungary was promoted to Division I

Group 2

Croatia came back from a two goal deficit to tie Romania, and thereby clinch a promotion to Division I.

Group 3

China was promoted to Division I.

Final Round 25–27 Place

Consolation Round 28–30 Place

Lithuania was promoted to Division I.

Consolation Round 31–33 Place

World Championship Group D (Iceland)
Played April 10–16 in Reykjavik.  The upcoming realignment meant that seven of the nine teams moved up to "Division II" for 2001.

First round

Group 1

Both Israel and Iceland were promoted to Division II.

Group 2

Both Australia and New Zealand were promoted to Division II.

Group 3

Both Belgium and South Africa were promoted to Division II.

Final Round 34–36 Place

Consolation Round 37–39 Place

Consolation Round 40–42 Place

''Both Luxembourg and Turkey had to stay behind in what was initially called Division II Qualification (later renamed Division III).  There was no third team to play against so they both simply skipped a year and joined Division II in 2002

Citations

See also
 Women's Championship
 World Juniors

References
Complete results at Passionhockey.com

Group A official results
Group B official results
Group C official results
Group D official results

IIHF Men's World Ice Hockey Championships
World Ice Hockey Championships - Men's